Televista TV is a Nigerian English-language broadcast television network owned by the Consolidated Media Associates. The network broadcasts programs, including several produced by the network itself, aimed at Nigerian and English speaking audience in Nigeria and around the world – featuring a mix of news programming, local drama, reality television series and telenovelas (both English-dubbed versions of Colombian, Filipino, Brazilian, Latin America and other imported telenovelas produced in Spanish-speaking countries).

Televista Digital Media, which distributes original programming content across digital and mobile platforms including iROKOtv while sourcing for the best content from all around the world to a demographic that includes Housewives and students to the less obvious (middle management to top management executives).

External links
 
  - TelevistaTV's Facebook Page
 TelevistaTV on Twitter
 TelevistaTV's Instagram

Television stations in Lagos